The 2011–12 Wisconsin Badgers men's basketball team represented University of Wisconsin–Madison in the 2011–12 NCAA Division I men's basketball season. This was coach Bo Ryan's eleventh season at the University of Wisconsin. They played their home games at the Kohl Center and are members of the Big Ten Conference. Wisconsin made it to the sweet 16, but lost to #1 seed Syracuse in the regional semifinals.

2011 Commitments

Season Notes
Jordan Taylor was Wisconsin's lone senior in their regular rotation, although fellow senior Rob Wilson earned a significant increase in postseason playing time following his shocking 30 point outburst in the Big Ten tournament. Ryan Evans and Jared Berggren were second and third in team scoring, 11.0 ppg and 10.5 ppg, respectively. Josh Gasser, Ben Brust, and Mike Bruesewitz were also key contributors.

There was a 3-way tie for the Big Ten regular season title with Michigan St, Michigan, and Ohio St all finishing 13-5. Wisconsin alone in 4th at 12-6.

Losing to Syracuse in the Sweet 16 in a close game, 63-64. Wisconsin had the ball in their leader's hands at the end of the game. But Jordan Taylor's 3-pointer at the buzzer came up empty.

Awards
All-Big Ten by Media
 Jordan Taylor - 2nd team
 Jarred Berggren - Honorable mention
 Ryan Evans - Honorable mention

All-Big Ten by Coaches
 Jordan Taylor - 1st team
 Jarred Berggren - Honorable mention
 Ryan Evans - Honorable mention
 Josh Gasser - All-Defensive team

Roster

Schedule and results
Source
All times are Central

|-
!colspan=12| Exhibition		
			
|-
!colspan=12| Regular Season		
			
			

			
			
			
			
			
			
			
			
			
			
			
			
			
			
			
			
			
			
			
	
			
			

	
			
		
|-
!colspan=12| Big Ten tournament	
	

|-
!colspan=12| NCAA Division I tournament

National Rankings

Player statistics

As of March 23, 2012

		        MINUTES    |--TOTAL--|   |--3-PTS--| |-F-THROWS-| |---REBOUNDS---|                 |-SCORING-| 
## Player           GP GS Tot  Avg  FG  FGA  Pct  3FG 3FA Pct FT FTA  Pct  Off Def Tot Avg PF FO  A TO Blk Stl Pts Avg 
11 Taylor, Jordan   36 36 1297 36.0 166 413 .402  65 176 .369 135 172 .785  31 106 137 3.8 73  0 147  56  1 37 532 14.8
05 Evans, Ryan      36 36 1098 30.5 151 343 .440  10  38 .263  85 117 .726  60 183 243 6.8 74  1  58  57 33 26 397 11.0
40 Berggren, Jared  36 36 1000 27.8 141 312 .452  45 121 .372  52  71 .732  51 125 176 4.9 86  2  27  51 60 32 379 10.5
21 Gasser, Josh     36 36 1227 34.1  84 181 .464  42  93 .452  65  83 .783  31 121 152 4.2 66  0  67  43  3 25 275  7.6
01 Brust, Ben       36  0  768 21.3  92 232 .397  58 149 .389  20  24 .833  16  63  79 2.2 33  0  26  26  0 24 262  7.3
31 Bruesewitz, Mike 36 36  918 25.5  71 180 .394  25  85 .294  36  51 .706  69 116 185 5.1 92  3  63  38 12 22 203  5.6
33 Wilson, Rob      36  0  467 13.0  49 118 .415  25  65 .385  22  32 .688  18  33  51 1.4 32  0  22  14  3  7 145  4.0
44 Kaminsky, Frank  35  0  271  7.7  23  56 .411  10  35 .286   7  14 .500  22  28  50 1.4 34  0  10  10 13  4  63  1.8
22 Wise, J.D.        6  0   10  1.7   3   3 1.000  1   1 1.000  0   0 .000   0   0   0 0.0  0  0   0   1  0  0   7  1.2
12 Jackson, Traevon 17  0   92  5.4   7  19 .368   3   8 .375   2   3 .667   6  10  16 0.9  7  0   3   7  1  1  19  1.1
02 Smith, Jordan     7  0   12  1.7   2   3 .667   1   1 1.000  0   0 .000   0   2   2 0.3  0  0   0   0  0  0   5  0.7
13 Dukan, Duje      13  0   41  3.2   4   7 .571   0   2 .000   1   4 .250   1   6   7 0.5  2  0   2   3  0  3   9  0.7
32 Anderson, Evan   14  0   35  2.5   3   6 .500   0   1 .000   0   4 .000   4   3   7 0.5 10  0   3   1  0  0   6  0.4
10 Fahey, Dan        9  0   14  1.6   1   2 .500   0   0 .000   0   0 .000   1   6   7 0.8  1  0   0   1  0  0   2  0.2
   Team                                                                    39  56  95       2     12 
   Total..........  36  7250  797 1875 .425 285 775 .368 425 575 .739 349 858 1207 33.5 512  6 428  320 126 181 2304 64.0
   Opponents......  36  7250  708 1819 .389 129 439 .294 370 542 .683 331 792 1123 31.2 604  7 286  388  84 154 1915 53.2

References

Wisconsin
Wisconsin Badgers men's basketball seasons
Wisconsin
Badge
Badge